Pterostylis procera, commonly known as the short-lipped greenhood, is a species of orchid endemic to Queensland. It has a rosette of leaves and when flowering a single translucent white flower with green and reddish markings and a labellum which does not protrude through the lateral sepals.

Description
Pterostylis procera is a terrestrial, perennial, deciduous, herb with an underground tuber and a rosette of dark green, wrinkled leaves. The dorsal sepal and petals are fused to form a hood or "galea" over the column, the dorsal sepal slightly longer than the petals and sharply pointed. There is a wide gap at each side of the flower between the petals and lateral sepals. The labellum does not protrude above the sinus. Flowering occurs from February to May.

Taxonomy and naming
Pterostylis procera was first described in 1989 by David Jones and Mark Clements and the description was published in Australian Orchid Research from a specimen collected near Herberton. The specific epithet (procera) is a Latin word meaning "tall", "slender" or "long".

Distribution and habitat
The short-lipped greenhood grows with grasses and shrubs in sheltered gullies between Mount Finnigan and Paluma at altitudes above .

References

procera
Orchids of Queensland
Plants described in 1989